Calvary Hospital may refer to:

Calvary Hospital, Bronx, a non profit institution in the borough of The Bronx in New York City
Calvary Hospital, Hobart, located in Lenah Valley, Tasmania
Calvary Hospital, Canberra, located in Bruce, Australian Capital Territory
Calvary Hospital, Wagga Wagga, located in Wagga Wagga, New South Wales
Calvary North Adelaide Hospital, located in North Adelaide, South Australia
Calvary Wakefield Hospital, located in Adelaide, Australia